The Anglican Diocese of Perth is one of the 23 dioceses of the Anglican Church of Australia. The constitution of the Diocese of Perth was passed and adopted in 1872 at the first synod held in Western Australia. In 1914, the Province of Western Australia was created and the diocesan bishop of Perth became ex officio metropolitan bishop of the new province and therefore also an archbishop.

The diocese incorporates the southern part of the state of Western Australia and includes the Christmas and Cocos Islands. The other dioceses in the Anglican Province of Western Australia are the Diocese of Bunbury and the Diocese of North West Australia.

History
The diocese is one of the 23 dioceses of the Anglican Church of Australia. The constitution of the diocese adopted in 1872 at the first synod held in Western Australia. In 1914, the Province of Western Australia was created and the diocesan bishop of Perth became ex officio metropolitan bishop of the new province and therefore also an archbishop.

The diocese incorporates the southern part of the state of Western Australia and includes the Christmas and Cocos Islands. It absorbed the Diocese of Kalgoorlie in 1972. The other dioceses in the Anglican Province of Western Australia are the Diocese of Bunbury and the Diocese of North West Australia.

Wollaston College is authorized by the Archbishop of Perth as the principal provider for theological education in the Diocese. It offers degree-level programs through its partnership with the University of Divinity.

Churchmanship
The diocese has traditionally had a variety of churchmanship and in recent years has largely moved toward a more liberal and moderate Catholic style. There are, however, parishes and clergy representative of all the main Anglican traditions.

On 10 February 2018, Kay Goldsworthy became the first female archbishop in the Anglican Communion on her installation to the archdiocese.

Administrative history
The Perth diocese, like all Australian dioceses, has had administrative procedures dealt with by the diocesan trustees. A range of other sub-committees of the diocese handle broader issues. The trustees were known in earlier times as the Trustees of Church Property.

The relationship of the church and government is not just from the proximity of the cathedral to government house. The land ownership and provision of favourable conditions for the diocese has occurred since establishment of the colony. The Diocesan Trustees and Diocesan Council are regularly observed to deal with significant land and building projects in the history of Perth.

In 1866, there were two archdeaconries: James Brown was Archdeacon of Perth and H. B. Thornhill of Geraldton.

Issues

In the early 2000s the diocese had a large group of Anglo-Catholics from the parish of St Patricks Mt Lawley under the leadership of the then parish priest and high-ranking member of the diocesan clergy, Harry Entwistle, leave to join with another community of the Traditional Anglican Communion which later entered into the Catholic Church as a community of the Personal Ordinariate of Our Lady of the Southern Cross, St Ninians and St Chads based in Mt Lawley. The Personal Ordinariates were created for Anglicans to enter into the Catholic Church and retain many elements of Anglican worship and spirituality, while accepting all doctrines of the Catholic Church. The group cited persecution and on going doctrinal issues for their leaving.

As a more liberal diocese, the region voted to recognise same-gender relationships in 2013. While Archbishop Roger Herft vetoed the motion, he did say that "what we have in the Diocese of course is a number of people in same-sex relationships amongst the clergy and amongst the laity and we have always said that people of all forms of sexuality and orientation are welcome." In a statement on human sexuality, Archbishop Herft confirmed that "there are gay and lesbian clergy serving in the priesthood. They are licensed by me and are honoured and respected as priests..." In April 2016, St Andrew's Church within the diocese blessed a same-sex couple's relationship. In 2019, the Diocese voted to no longer prohibit clergy form sexual relationships outside of marriage. In 2022, Archbishop Kay Goldsworthy ordained an openly gay man in a same-sex civil partnership.

The cathedral church of the diocese is St George's Cathedral, Perth.

List of Bishops and Archbishops of Perth

Assistant bishops

See also
St George's Cathedral, Perth
St Bartholomew's Church
Coogee Hotel, Western Australia, used as an orphanage by the Anglican Diocese of Perth

References

Further reading

External links
 – official site

 
Perth
1857 establishments in Australia
Province of Western Australia